The  is a district located in Ehime Prefecture, Japan.

As of 2005, the estimated population is 20,784 with a total area is 299.50 km2.

The district includes one town.

Uchiko

Origin of name
The name "Kita" is first found in the year 901 in the Nihon Sandai Jitsuroku. The Kita district originally formed the northern part of the Uwa District; kita (北) means "north", though nonstandard kanji (喜多) are used in this case.

History
November 8, 1866 — Northern Uwa District broke off and formed Kita District.
1877 — The district was re-instituted by Meiji era land reforms. (2 towns, 34 villages)
January 1878 — The district hall was placed in the town of Ōzu (now the city of Ōzu).
1889 — The village of Nakayama was reassigned to the Shimoukena District (now the city of Iyo). (2 towns, 33 villages)
February 1899 — The village of Hirano from Nishiuwa District was reassigned to the Kita District. (2 towns, 34 villages)
April 1, 1908 — The villages of Taira and Kita merged to become the village of Ōzu. (2 towns, 33 villages)
September 30, 1908 — Parts of the village of Shimonada in Iyo District merged into the village of Mitsuho.
April 1, 1909
The village of Tadokoro merged into the village of Yanagisawa. (2 towns, 32 villages)
The villages of Yamatokasa and Okuna merged to form the village of Kawabe. (2 towns, 31 villages)
May 21, 1920 — The village of Ikazaki gained town status to become the town of Ikazaki. (3 towns, 30 villages)
November 1, 1921 — The villages of Ōnaru and Kurakawa merged to become the village of Ōkawa. (3 towns, 28 villages)
January 1, 1922 — The villages of Shiba and Takigawa merged to become the village of Shirataki. (3 towns, 28 villages)
April 1, 1922
The villages of Toyoshige and Aioi merged to become the village of Yamato. (3 towns, 27 villages)
The village of Kitayama merged into the village of Niiya. (3 towns, 26 villages)
August 10, 1925 — Parts of the village of Minamikume merged into the town of Ōzu.
December 26, 1929 — The village of Murasaki split and merged into the villages of Gojō, Ōse, and Tenjin. (3 towns, 25 villages)
January 1, 1934 — The village of Kume merged into the town of Ōzu. (3 towns, 23 villages)
April 1, 1943 — The villages of Kawabe, Ōtani, Uwagawa, and parts of the village of Ukena from Kamiukena District, merged to form the village of Hijikawa. (3 towns, 21 villages)
April 1, 1948 — Parts of the village of Hikjikawa merged into the village of Ōkawa.
January 1, 1951 — The village of Hijikawa broke up into the villages of Hijikawa and Kawabe. (3 towns, 22 villages)
September 1, 1954
The villages of Hirano, Awazu, Miyoshi, Kamisukai, the town of Ōzu, and the villages of Minamikume, Sugeta, Niiya, Yanagisawa, and Ōkawa merged to form the city of Ōzu. (2 towns, 12 villages)
The villages of Tenjin, and Misogi merged into the town of Ikazaki. (2 towns, 11 villages)
January 1, 1955
The village of Kitanada, the town of Nagahama, and the villages of Kushū, Izumi, Yamato, and Shirataki merged to become the town of Nagahama. (3 towns, 6 villages)
The villages of Mitsuho, Tatsukawa, Gojō, and Ōse merged into the town of Uchiko. (3 towns, 2 villages)
February 11, 1955 — Parts of the village of Kaibuki from Higashiuwa District and parts of the village of Yokobayashi from Higashiuwa District merged into the village of Hijikawa.
November 3, 1959 — The village of Hijikawa gained town status to become the town of Hijikawa. (4 towns, 1 village)
January 1, 2005 — The towns of Ikazaki, and Oda from Kamiukena District, merged into the town of Uchiko. (3 towns, 1 village)
January 11, 2005 — The towns of Hijikawa and Nagahama, and the village of Kawabe merged into the expanded city of Ōzu. (1 town)

Kita District